Rick Kosick (born May 25, 1967) is an American photographer and cinematographer. He is a crew member, and supporting cast member of the Jackass TV series and the four Jackass movies.

Early career
Kosick started out as a freelance photographer for Poweredge and Slap skateboarding magazines and built up fame as a skateboard photographer. His photography also caught the attention of the rock band Deftones who contracted Kosick to shoot the cover art to their album Around the Fur. This cover was voted by Revolver magazine as one of the greatest metal covers ever. Kosick was later approached by the editor of Big Brother to become a photographer and later head photo editor. His work at Big Brother inspired other skate photographers. He also had involvement in the creation of the Big Brother video series. Kosick's likeness was featured on a skateboard for Birdhouse Skateboards on an Andrew Reynolds board.

Jackass and follow-on projects
Following the end of Big Brother, Kosick worked as a freelance photographer until former Big Brother editor Jeff Tremaine approached him for a role in Tremaine's upcoming TV series Jackass. Kosick is often filmed being picked on by other Jackass crew members under the auspices of a legitimate stunt, usually only a ruse set up to tease Kosick. He usually didn't tolerate many of the pranks played against him.

Current projects
Kosick currently works as a freelance photographer and camera operator. He worked on Wildboyz, Nitro Circus and Rob and Big on MTV and MTV2. Kosick produced, directed, and edited Manny Puig's straight-to-DVD title, Ultimate Predator.

Kosick recently directed an electronic presskit video for the Los Angeles Band HDR and other music videos for Roger Alan Wade, Smut Peddlers, Lil Wyte with Three Six Mafia, House of Broken Promises and Scream for Me.

Kosick was a prominent member of the staff at Jackassworld.com as a content producer, and had his own online show 'jackass world live' (formerly known as The 4:20 Show with Rick Kosick), which also commonly features other staff members including Sean Cliver and Greg Wolf amongst others. The show was supposed to go live on Wednesdays at 4:20 pm PST, but was known for regularly being late (picking up the name 4:20ish Show from community members) and amongst other reasons, was why the show was renamed.

Kosick also worked behind the camera on Raab Himself's Bathroom Break podcast on YouTube.

Filmography

Film

Television

Web series

Music videos

References

External links

Official website

1967 births
Living people
American cinematographers
American people of Macedonian descent
American photographers
American television personalities
Male television personalities
Jackass (TV series)
People from Oak Park, Illinois
Skate photographers